Md. Abdus Sattar is a Bangladesh Awami League politician and Member of Parliament. He is currently serving as a secretary of trade in Bangladesh Awami League.

Early life 
Sattar was born on 21 February 1952 in Ishwarganj Upazila, Mymensingh District, East Bengal, Pakistan.

He passed his matriculation from Ishwarganj Bisweswari Pilot High School.

Career 
Sattar worked as an importer. He was elected to the 9th Parliament of Bangladesh in 2009 from the Mymensingh-8 constituency. He served as the chairman of the Parliamentary Standing Committee on Ministry of Post and Telecommunication. He was a member of the Parliamentary Standing Committee on Ministry of Labour and Employment and Parliamentary Standing Committee on Ministry of Housing and Public Works.

References

Awami League politicians
Living people
7th Jatiya Sangsad members
9th Jatiya Sangsad members
Year of birth missing (living people)